Angola competed at the 2016 Summer Olympics in Rio de Janeiro, Brazil, from 5 to 21 August 2016. This was the nation's ninth consecutive appearance at the Summer Olympics, with the exception of the 1984 Summer Olympics in Los Angeles, because of its participation in the Soviet boycott.

The Angolan Olympic Committee selected a total of 25 athletes, 8 men and 17 women, for the Games, competing in seven different sports. The nation's team size was roughly ten athletes smaller than the team sent to London four years earlier, and had the second largest share of women in its Summer Olympic history. Women's handball was the only team-based sport in which Angola had its representation at these Games, unable to send any of the nation's basketball teams to the Olympics for the first time since 1988. Among the sports played by the athletes, Angola marked its debut in rowing and a return in sailing and shooting from a two-decade absence.

Notable Angolan athletes featured three-time judoka Antónia Moreira, medley swimmer Pedro Pinotes, trap shooter João Paulo da Silva, who sought for his Olympic comeback in Rio after a 16-year absence, and four-time Olympian and handball team captain Luísa Kiala, who became the nation's flag bearer in the opening ceremony. Angola, however, has yet to win its first ever Olympic medal.

Athletics

Angola has received universality slots from IAAF to send two athletes (one male and one female) to the Olympics.

Key
 Note – Ranks given for track events are within the athlete's heat only
 Q = Qualified for the next round
 q = Qualified for the next round as a fastest loser or, in field events, by position without achieving the qualifying target
 NR = National record
 N/A = Round not applicable for the event
 Bye = Athlete not required to compete in round

Track & road events

Handball

Summary
Key:
 ET – After extra time
 P – Match decided by penalty-shootout.

Women's tournament

Angola women's handball team qualified for the Olympics by winning the 2015 Africa Qualification Tournament in Luanda. They were drawn in Group A of the preliminary round.

Team roster

Preliminary round

Quarterfinal

Judo

Angola has qualified one judoka for the women's middleweight category (70 kg) at the Games. Remarkably going to her third Olympics, Antónia Moreira earned a continental quota spot from the African region as the highest-ranked Angolan judoka outside of direct qualifying position in the IJF World Ranking List of 30 May 2016.

Rowing

Angola has qualified one boat in the men's lightweight double sculls for the Games at the 2015 African Continental Qualification Regatta in Tunis, Tunisia.

Qualification Legend: FA=Final A (medal); FB=Final B (non-medal); FC=Final C (non-medal); FD=Final D (non-medal); FE=Final E (non-medal); FF=Final F (non-medal); SA/B=Semifinals A/B; SC/D=Semifinals C/D; SE/F=Semifinals E/F; QF=Quarterfinals; R=Repechage

Sailing

Angolan sailors have qualified one boat in each of the following classes through the individual fleet World Championships, and African qualifying regattas, signifying the nation's Olympic return to the sport for the first time since 1992. Another boat was also awarded to the Angolan sailor competing in the men's Laser through a Tripartite Commission invitation.

M = Medal race; EL = Eliminated – did not advance into the medal race

Shooting

Angola has received an invitation from the Tripartite Commission to send a men's trap shooter to the Olympics, as long as the minimum qualifying score (MQS) was met by 31 March 2016. This also signified the nation's comeback to the sport for the first time since 2000.

Qualification Legend: Q = Qualify for the next round; q = Qualify for the bronze medal (shotgun)

Swimming

Angola has received a Universality invitation from FINA to send two swimmers (one male and one female) to the Olympics.

References

External links
 
 

Nations at the 2016 Summer Olympics
2016
Olympics